The 1962 Illinois Fighting Illini football team was an American football team that represented the University of Illinois during the 1962 Big Ten Conference football season.  In their third year under head coach Pete Elliott, the Illini compiled a 2–7 record and finished in eighth place in the Big Ten Conference. Halfback Ken Zimmerman was selected as the team's most valuable player.

Schedule

References

Illinois
Illinois Fighting Illini football seasons
Illinois Fighting Illini football